Kigumba–Masindi–Hoima–Kabwoya Road is a road in the Western Region of Uganda, connecting the towns of Kigumba in Kiryandongo District, Masindi in Masindi District, Hoima in Hoima District and Kabwoya, in Kikuube District.

Location
The coordinates of the road near Masindi are 1°40'20.0"N, 31°42'19.0"E (Latitude:1.672222; Longitude:31.705278).

Upgrading to bitumen
Before 2013, the road was unsealed gravel surface. That year, the Uganda National Roads Authority (UNRA) initiated the procurement process for road works to upgrade the road to class II bitumen surface. The road was divided into two sections: the Kigumba–Bulima section  and the Bulima–Kabwoya section . The upgrade, budgeted at US$150 million, is funded by the African Development Bank and the government of Uganda.

The upgrade was initially planned to start in 2014, but there were disagreements during the tendering and procurement process. As of July 2014, the road works are yet to begin.

In September 2021, Allen Kagina, the executive director of Uganda National Road Authority, reported that the upgrade of this road to class II bitumen surface had been completed during the 2020/2021 financial year that ended on 30 June 2021.

In January 2022, Yoweri Museveni, the President of Uganda commissioned the completed road, in the presence of Robinah Nabbanja, the prime minister of Uganda and Allen Kagina, the Executive Director of Uganda National Roads Authority (UNRA).

See also
 List of roads in Uganda
 Economy of Uganda
 Transport in Uganda

References

External links
 Uganda National Road Authority Homepage
 Regional Imbalance: The Story of Road Construction In Uganda
 Government Secures Funds for Masindi-Kyenjojo Road - 14 December 2012

Roads in Uganda
Kiryandongo District
Masindi District
Hoima District
Bunyoro sub-region
Western Region, Uganda